Evolution is a 2021 Hungarian drama film directed by Kornél Mundruczó and written by Kata Wéber. 

The film was shown in the Cannes Premiere section at the 2021 Cannes Film Festival, and was released in Hungary on 25 November 2021.

Cast

 Lili Monori as Eva
 Annamária Láng as Lena
 Padmé Hamdemir as Yasmin
 Goya Rego as Jonas
 Jule Bowe as Frau Clausen

References

External links
 

2021 films
2021 drama films
2020s Hungarian-language films
Films about the aftermath of the Holocaust
Films directed by Kornél Mundruczó
Hungarian drama films